"Bob's your uncle" is a phrase commonly used in the United Kingdom and Commonwealth countries that means "and there it is", or "and there you have it", or "it's done". Typically, someone says it to conclude a set of simple instructions or when a result is reached. The meaning is similar to that of the French expression "".

Synonyms and variations
Expressions of self-satisfaction or pride or delight at the end of a sentence describing an action, a situation, an instruction, or direction, especially when it seems easier or quicker than expected:
 The long version Bob's your uncle and Fanny's your aunt meaning "and there you are", or "it's that easy!", or "(after that) it's done!", or "(after that,) you have achieved what you wanted to achieve". One variant is Bob's your uncle and Fanny's your granny. Other variants, of both versions, spell your as yer.
 This longer version may have been shortened to Bob's your uncle because Fanny has taken on a sexual meaning (late 20th century) since the expression was coined.
Expressions with a stronger emphasis on easiness or delight:
 Piece of cake, an informal expression for something very easy.
 It's a doddle, another slang expression for something very easy or it's a cinch.
 Easy peasy, a childish expression for something very easy.

Expressions with a stronger emphasis on self-satisfaction or pride of achievement or just delight:
 Job done, something said when someone has achieved something, especially when it seems easier or quicker than expected.
 Job's a good'un, similar slang meaning "and there you go", or "it's done with!", or "it's finished with", or "it is completed to everyone's satisfaction".
 Lovely jubbly, made famous by 'Del Boy' the main character from long-running English sitcom Only Fools And Horses, "lovely jubbly" refers to "lovely job", or "great", or "good news", or "it is completed to everyone's satisfaction or profit".
 It's in the bag, meaning "job done", or "and there you go", or "great job!", or "it's all yours!", or "it's completed to your own benefit!"
 Back of the net, literally meaning "goal" or "success!", but used for "great", or "victory at last", or "result!", or "it's completed to your own satisfaction!"

Origin

The origins are uncertain, but a common theory is that the expression arose after Conservative Prime Minister Robert Gascoyne-Cecil, 3rd Marquess of Salisbury ("Bob") appointed his nephew Arthur Balfour as Chief Secretary for Ireland in 1887, an act of nepotism, which was apparently both surprising and unpopular. Whatever other qualifications Balfour might have had, "Bob's your uncle" was seen as the conclusive one.

The main weakness in this theory is that the first documented usage of "Bob’s Your Uncle" is in the title of a new song in an advertisement for Herman Darewski Music Publishing Co., published in The Stage (London) on 11 January 1923. If Salisbury's notorious nepotism toward Balfour in the 1880s had been so widely spoken of to inspire a popular phrase, it is perhaps unlikely that it would have taken nearly forty years for it to appear in print for the first time.

Cultural references 
In 1954, the song "Bob's Yer Uncle! (an' Fanny's yer aunt)" was a hit on the British sheet music sales charts, reaching No. 22 on 12 June that year. Composed by Tommie Connor and Eddie Lisbona, the first recording released in Britain was by American singer Guy Mitchell in May 1954. The following month, two covers by British artists were released: one by actor John Slater, and another by Billy Cotton and his Band, with vocals by Alan Breeze and The Bandits. The Mitchell version was not released in his native America.

The phrase is used by characters in numerous works of art, entertainment, and media. The following are examples:

 In Mary Poppins, Bert uses the phrase to describe how quickly unusual things happen when in Mary's presence.
 In Pirates of the Caribbean, Jack Sparrow says it when warning Barbossa about the Dauntless and its crew waiting outside of the Isla de Muerta.
 In Marvel's Agents of S.H.I.E.L.D., Agent Leo Fitz uses the phrase after he explains how they tracked a Rising Tide Hacker in Season 1, Episode 5, "Girl in the Flower Dress"
 In Marvel's Agents of S.H.I.E.L.D., Agent Phil Coulson uses the phrase to describe the ease of infiltrating Cybertek's headquarters in Season 1, Episode 22, "The Beginning of the End."
 In Weeds, Doug uses the phrase to tell Nancy how quickly her money problems will disappear if she sets up a money laundering business front in order to hide her proceeds from dealing drugs in Season 1 Episode 2 "Free Goat".
 In Flaked, Chip uses the phrase to tell Kara how easy it is to lock the door to his store in Season 1 Episode 1 "Westminster".
 In Mr. Robot, Romero uses the phrase to tell Elliot how easy it will be to hack the climate control systems of Steel Mountain with the Raspberry Pi in Season 1 Episode 5 "eps1.4_3xpl0its.wmv".
 In Homestuck, Caliope uses the phrase to explain Godtier to Dirk after which he questions its meaning.
 In Hitchcock's Frenzy the fruit merchant turned necktie murderer, Robert Rusk (Barry Foster), uses the phrase several times while actually referring to himself. "Anytime, don't forget Bob's your uncle" and later again, "I told you, Bob's your uncle". In those contexts, the phrase didn't seem to mean "And voila--there you have it," like in most of this article. Rather, Rusk simply seems to be claiming a paternal—or avuncular—concern for and offering aid to his friend in trouble.
 In 101 Dalmatians, Horace says it when Jasper tells him to grab a torch and we'll run them down.
 In Lock, Stock and Two Smoking Barrels, Diamond Dog says, "and Robert's your father's brother, savvy?" after issuing detailed orders on the robbery his gang is about to commit.
 In The Simpsons episode S11E15 "Missionary: Impossible" Homer says, "I'll help with your next charity scam;" Lovejoy: "The word is 'drive';" Homer: "Sure, sure, Bob's your uncle". Also in The Simpsons episode, "A Streetcar Named Marge" from season 4, Bart says "Bob's your uncle, mate!" while Marge, Lisa, and Bart tear back and forth in southern and cockney English accents, respectively. 
 In Terry Pratchett's Guards! Guards!, the phrase is used as a running gag throughout the novel.
 In the animated show "Archer" in the season 2 episode "Double Deuce", Woodhouse's deceased Captain during WWII says, "Bob's your uncle!" when proposing to his crew to start a tontine.
 In The 100 season three episode "Red Sky at Morning" and season four episode "The Chosen", Monty uses the phrase, and in season five episode "Damocles Part 2" Raven says it.
 In Mission: Impossible – Ghost Protocol, while suggesting a plan for the team, Benji uses the phrase.
 In the 1951 movie Scrooge, when Scrooge presents his housekeeper with a guinea as a Christmas present and gives her the day off, she exclaims "Bob's your uncle!" before she leaves.
 In the British situation comedy Waiting for God, the head of the retirement community Harvey Baines explains one of his plans to the relatives of two of the residents, and at the end says "[...] and Robert is your father's brother." When they show they don't understand what he tells them, he adds on, "Bob's your uncle."
 In Supergirl season four episode "Bunker Hill", Kara uses the phrase.
 In the seventh series of the British TV show Doctor Who, the Doctor uses the expression in the ninth episode titled "Hide" following a detailed enumeration of the steps of his rescue plan.
In the TV detective series 77 Sunset Strip, 01/05/1967, Episode 16—"The Down Under Caper"—when Paddy the foreman takes direction from the ranch owner and Spencer's client, Margaret, before leaving on a supply run.
In Ricky Gervais' Netflix series After Life, episode 2, Ricky's character "Tony" tells his father "Bob's your uncle", to which he replies, "Is he?"
In "DC's Legends of Tomorrow" S5:E9 26 min. Charlie/Clotho says "[...] all I'll do is just run over there, put my hand in that hole, grab the ring, Bob's your uncle."
In "Monk (TV Series)" S8:E7 "Mr. Monk and the Voodoo Curse" Lt. Disher says "Bob's your uncle" after explaining the crime scene, this leads to an argument with Capt. Stodelmyer as to what it means. Disher explains the niece reported the crime and that the victim's name was Robert.
In the 1990 album by Happy Mondays 'Pills 'n' Thrills And Bellyaches' 'Bob's yer Uncle' is the sixth track.

See also
 Garnet Wolseley, 1st Viscount Wolseley, inspiration for "everything's all Sir Garnet"

References

Further reading
 

British English idioms
English phrases